This is a list of buildings related to Foot Locker, Inc., its predecessors, or the Woolworth family.

References

Woolworth Buildings

Woolworth buildings